The 2010 general election took place on 6 May 2010 and saw each of Parliament's 650 constituencies return one Member of Parliament (MP) to the House of Commons. Parliament, which consists of the House of Lords and the elected House of Commons, was convened on 25 May at the Palace of Westminster by Queen Elizabeth II. It was dissolved at the beginning of 30 March 2015, being 25 working days ahead of the 2015 general election on 7 May 2015.

The Conservative Party, led by David Cameron, became the single largest party, though without an overall majority. This resulted in a hung parliament. A coalition agreement was then formed following negotiations with the Liberal Democrats and their leader Nick Clegg. John Bercow resumed his role as Speaker of the House of Commons. In September 2010, Ed Miliband won a Labour Party leadership vote to succeed Gordon Brown as permanent Leader of the Opposition.

In the House of Lords, Baroness Hayman (formerly a Labour member) resumed her role as Lord Speaker until the end of her five-year term in 2011, after which she did not seek re-election in the house. Peers elected former Crossbencher Baroness D'Souza to replace her. From the start of this Parliament the Lords were "led" by Lord Strathclyde without an absolute majority on his Conservative benches.  In January 2013 he stood down and was succeeded by Lord Hill of Oareford.

Notable newcomers elected in this general election included Liz Kendall, Guto Bebb, Gloria De Piero, Sajid Javid, Michael Dugher, Amber Rudd, Lisa Nandy, Damian Hinds, Anna Soubry, Heidi Alexander, Jacob Rees-Mogg, Alison McGovern, Chris Williamson, Owen Smith, Nicky Morgan, Tristram Hunt, Dan Poulter, Esther McVey, Priti Patel, Luciana Berger, Karen Bradley, Chuka Umunna, Louise Mensch, Dominic Raab, Tracey Crouch, Valerie Vaz and Caroline Lucas.

During the 2010–15 Parliament, John Bercow was the Speaker, David Cameron served as Prime Minister, and Harriet Harman and Ed Miliband served as Leader of the Opposition.

House of Commons composition (2010 and 2015)

These are graphical representations of the House of Commons showing a comparison of party strengths as it was directly after the 2010 general election and before the 2015 general election:

 

This table shows the number of MPs in each party:

Notes:
The Scottish National Party and Plaid Cymru sat together as a party group.
Sinn Féin did not take its seats.
This is not the official seating plan of the House of Commons, which has five rows of benches on each side, with the government party to the right of the Speaker and opposition parties to the left, but with room for only around two-thirds of MPs to sit at any one time.

List of MPs elected in the general election
The following table is a list of MPs elected, ordered by constituency.  As the constituency boundaries changed for this election, the "notional incumbent" column lists the party estimated to have won the seat at the 2005 election, had that election been conducted under the new boundaries.

Names of incumbents are listed where they stood for re-election; for details of defeated new candidates and the incumbent who stood down in those cases see individual constituency articles.

Changes and by-elections
After a general election, changes can occur in the composition of the House of Commons. This happens as a result of the election of Deputy Speakers, by-elections, defections, suspensions or removal of whip.

Technically, MPs cannot resign. However, they can effectively do so by requesting to be appointed as the Crown Steward and Bailiff of the Manor of Northstead or the Crown Steward and Bailiff of the three Chiltern Hundreds of Stoke, Desborough and Burnham, which vacates their seat.

The net outcome of all changes at the dissolution of Parliament resulted in four fewer Conservative MPs, two fewer Labour MPs, one fewer Liberal Democrat MP, four more independent MPs, the addition of one Respect MP and the addition of two UKIP MPs. This resulted in a reduction of the actual government majority from eighty-three to seventy-three. Both Respect and UKIP were previously unrepresented in the fifty-fifth Parliament. This was the first time that candidates standing for UKIP had been elected to the House of Commons.

Deputy Speakers
Although Deputy Speakers do not resign from their parties, they cease to vote (except to break ties) and they do not participate in party-political activity until the next election.
Lindsay Hoyle (Lab, Chorley) was elected Chairman of Ways and Means.
Nigel Evans (Con, Ribble Valley) was elected First Deputy Chairman of Ways and Means and held the position until his resignation on 10 September 2013.
Dawn Primarolo (Lab, Bristol South) was elected Second Deputy Chairman of Ways and Means.
Eleanor Laing (Con, Epping Forest) was elected First Deputy Chairman of Ways and Means on 16 October 2013.

By-elections

By-elections are held for seats that become vacant. If a vacancy is created within a certain period of time before the next general election, then a by-election may not be held, with that seat being left vacant for the remainder of the Parliament.

Defections, suspensions and removal of whip
In some situations, the label which MPs sit in the House of Commons under can change. When this happens, MPs often become independents.

See also
List of MPs for constituencies in Northern Ireland 2010–15
List of MPs for constituencies in Scotland 2010–15
List of MPs for constituencies in England 2010–15
List of MPs for constituencies in Wales 2010–15
List of United Kingdom MPs by seniority, 2010–15
:Category:UK MPs 2010–2015

References

External links
General Election 2010 – Results BBC News
Full election data as a spreadsheet, The Guardian

UK MPs
2010 United Kingdom general election
2010